Baltinava Parish is an administrative territorial entity of Balvi Municipality in the Latgale region of Latvia. It was formerly part of the ex-Balvi District. Following the Administrative territorial reform of Latvia in 2009 it was reorganized into Baltinava Municipality, which was merged into Balvi Municipality in 2021.

References 

Parishes of Latvia
Balvi Municipality
Latgale